Ceroplesis elegans is a species of beetle in the family Cerambycidae. It was described by Gestro in 1889. It is known from Saudi Arabia and Yemen.

References 

elegans
Beetles described in 1889